Park Byung-woo (born 28 June 1969) is a South Korean cross-country skier. He competed in the men's 50 kilometre freestyle event at the 1988 Winter Olympics.

References

1969 births
Living people
South Korean male cross-country skiers
Olympic cross-country skiers of South Korea
Cross-country skiers at the 1988 Winter Olympics
Place of birth missing (living people)
20th-century South Korean people